Abd Allah, also spelled Abdallah, Abdellah, Abdollah, Abdullah , Abdulla , Abdalla and many others, is an Arabic name meaning "Servant of God". It is built from the Arabic words abd and Allāh. Although the first letter "a" in Allāh, as the first letter of the article al-, is usually unstressed in Arabic, it is usually stressed in the pronunciation of this name. The variants Abdollah and Abdullah represent the elision of this "a" following the "u" of the literary Arabic nominative case (pronounced  in Persian). Abd Allah is one of many Arabic theophoric names, meaning servant of God. God's Follower is also a meaning of this name.

Humility before God is an essential value of Islam, hence Abdullah is a common name among Muslims. However, the name of the Islamic prophet Muhammad's father was Abdullah. The prophet's father died before his birth, which indicates that the name was already in use in pre-Islamic Arabia.

It is also common among Mizrahi Jews, especially Iraqi Jews and Syrian Jews. The name is cognate to and has the same meaning as the Hebrew Abdiel and, more commonly, Obadiah. There were two Jewish Rabbis in Medina before Islam came; they were Abdullah ibn Salam and Abdullah ibn Shuria. Abdullah ibn Saba was a Yemenite Jew during the spread of Islam.

The variant used in the Russian language is "" (Abdulla) (cf. Fedul, which has similar origins), with "" (Abdul) and "" (Gabdulla) often used in Adyghe. The Spanish variant is Abdala.

The Christian Arabic Bible uses the word Allah for God. Presently in the Middle East, the name is sometimes used by Christians as a given or family name.

Given name

Abd Allah
 Abd Allah ibn Muhammad, son of Muhammad
 Abd Allah ibn Uthman, son of third caliph Uthman
 Abd Allah ibn Abd Allah, companion of Muhammad
 Abd Allah ibn Abi Bakr, son of caliph Abu Bakr
 Abd Allah ibn Saba, Jewish anti-Rashidun rebel
 Abd Allah ibn Salam, Jewish convert to Islam
 Abd Allah ibn Ubayy (died 631), leading inhabitant of Medina and contemporary of Muhammad
 Abd Allah ibn Umar (610–693 CE), narrator of hadith
 Abd Allah ibn al-Zubayr, (died 692), ruler of the 8th-century Zubayrid Caliphate
 Abd Allah ibn Yazid, an Umayyad prince and Military leader
 Abd Allah ibn Harun al-Rashid (died 833 CE), better known by his regnal name al-Ma'mun, seventh Abbasid caliph
 Abd-Allah ibn Musa al-Hadi, an Abbasid prince and son of Caliph Al-Hadi

Abdalla
Abdalla El-Masri, Lebanese composer
Abdalla Hamdok, most recent Sudanese president, who was deposed in a coup

Abdallah
 Abdallah Abdalsalam (born 1983), Egyptian volleyball player
 Abdallah al-Adil (1224–1227), Caliph of Morocco
 Abdallah Aich (born 1995), Lebanese footballer
 Abdallah ibn Amir, Rashidun politician and military officer
 Abdallah Djaballah (born 1956), Algerian politician
 Abdallah Kamal (1965–2014), Egyptian journalist and politician
 Abdallah El Maaroufi (1944–2011), Moroccan diplomat 
 Abdallah ibn al-Mu'tazz (861–908), Arab poet
 Abdallah Saaf (born 1949), Moroccan academic and politician
 Abdallah ibn Sa'd, Arab administrator and commander 
 Abdallah Shihiri, politician of the Somali Dervish movement 
 Abdallah Somekh (1813–1889), Iraqi rabbi
 Abdallah El-Yafi (1901–1986), Lebanese politician

Abdelilah
Abdelilah Saber (born 1974), Moroccan association football player

Abdellah
Abdellah Béhar (born 1963), French runner
Abdellah Blinda (born 1951), Moroccan association football manager
Abdellah Liegeon (born 1957), Algerian association football player
Abdellah Ouzghar, Canadian and Moroccan, arrested after attacks of Sept 11, 2001

Abdollah

Abdollah Jassbi, Iranian academic
Abdollah Mojtabavi, Iranian sport wrestler
Abdollah Movahed, Iranian sport wrestler
Abdollah Nouri, Iranian reformist politician
Abdollah Ramezanzadeh, Iranian academic
Abdollah Shahbazi, Iranian researcher
Seyyed Abdollah Fateminia, Iranian Cleric
Abdollah Javadi-Amoli, Iranian Cleric

Abdulai
Abdulai Bell-Baggie, English association football player
Abdulai Conteh, Sierra Leonean politician

Abdulah
Abdulah Gegić (1924–2008), Yugoslav football coach and doctor of sciences in the veterinary field
Abdulah Ibraković, Bosnian professional football manager
Abdulah Muhasilović, Bosnian army chaplain
Abdulah Mutapčić, Bosnian politician
Abdulah Nakaš (1944–2005), Bosnian surgeon
Abdulah Oruč, Bosnian professional football manager 
Abdulah Sidran, Bosnian poet
Abdulah Skaka, Bosnian politician

Abdullah
 Abdullah ibn Abd al-Muttalib (545–570), the father of Muhammad
 Abdullah I (disambiguation), multiple rulers
 Abdullah II (disambiguation), multiple rulers
 Abdullah (Chagatai Khanate) (died 1359), ruler of the Chagatai
 Abdullah (Ismaili Mustaali Missionary), first Ismaili, Fatimid, mustaali saint to reach India, c. 1067 AD
 Abdullah ibn Abbas, narrator of hadith
 Abdullah Abdullah (born 1960), the former foreign minister of Afghanistan
 Abdullah Ahmed Abdullah (1963–2020), al-Qaeda terrorist
 Abdullah al-Amiri, judge in the trial of Iraqi dictator Saddam Hussein who was replaced after allegations of bias
 Abdullah Anderson (born 1996), American football player
 Abdullah Atalar (born 1954), Turkish academic
 Abdullah Avcı (born 1963), Turkish association football manager
 Abdullah Aydoğdu (born 1991), Turkish Paralympian goalball player
 Abdullah Yusuf Azzam (1941–1989), Islamist leader, assassinated in 1989
 Abdullah Ahmad Badawi (born 1939), Prime Minister of Malaysia (2003–2009)
 Abdullah el Baqui (1886–1952), Bengali Islamic scholar, writer and politician
 Abdullah Baybaşin, Turkish mob boss
 Abdullah Bishara (born 1936), Kuwaiti diplomat
 Abdullah Bughra, Emir of the First East Turkestan Republic
 Abdullah Cevdet, Turkish physician
 Abdullah Çatlı, Turkish convicted drug trafficker
 Abdullah Al Damluji, Iraqi physician and politician
 Abdullah Demirbaş (born 1966), Turkish politician
 Abdullah Durak (born 1987), Turkish association football player
 Abdullah Ercan (born 1971), Turkish association football player
 Abdullah Gül (born 1950), Turkish politician and former President
 Abdullah Halman (born 1987), Turkish association football player
 Abdullah bin Suleiman Al Hamdan (1887–1965), Saudi Arabian politician and businessman
 Abdullah al-Harari, Islamic scholar
 Abdullah I of Jordan (1882–1951), Emir of Transjordan (1921–1946) and King of Jordan (1946–1951)
 Abdullah II of Jordan (born 1962), King of Jordan since 1999
 Abdullah İçel, Turkish-Belgian futsal player
 Abdullah Abdul Kadir (1796–1854), early 19th century Malay writer
 Abdullah Khadr, Canadian ex-prisoner of the "War on Terror"
 Abdullah bin Ahmad Al Khalifa (1769–1849), ruler of Bahrain between 1821 and 1843
 Abdullah Khan (disambiguation), multiple people
 Abdullah Kobayashi, born Yosuke Kobayashi, Japanese wrestler
 Abdullah al Mahmood, Bengali politician and former minister in Pakistan
 Abdullah Malallah, Emirati association football player
 Abdullah al Mamun (disambiguation), multiple people
 Abdullah Mando, Syrian footballer
 Abdullah ibn Masud (died 652), a companion of Muhammad
 Abdullah Mirza (1410–1451), ruler of the Timurid Empire
 Abdullah Morsi, son of former Egyptian President Mohamed Morsi
 Abdullah Muhammad Shah II of Perak, one of the parties to the Pangkor Treaty of 1874
 Abdullah Abbas Nadwi, Islamic scholar
 Abdullah bin Zayed Al Nahyan, United Arab Emirati politician
 Abdullah Nangyal, Pashtun human rights activist and one of the leaders of the Pashtun Tahafuz Movement
 Abdullah Al Nuaimi, Emirati engineer and politician
 Abdullah Oğuz, Turkish film director
 Abdullah Öcalan (born 1948), Kurdish opposition leader and founder of the Kurdistan Workers Party
 Abdullah Öztürk (born 1989), Turkish para table tennis player
 Abdullah of Pahang (b. 1959), King of Malaysia and Sultan of Pahang
 Abdullah bin Ali Al Rashid (1788–1848), founder of the Emirate of Jabal Shammar
 Abdullah bin Ghazi (1935–1998), Pakistani religious scholar and founder of Faridia University, Islamabad
 Abdullah Al Rasi (1929–1994), Lebanese physician and politician
 Abdullah ibn Rawaha (C. 590–629), general in the Battle of Mut'ah
 Abdullah bin Saud Al Saud (died 1819), Ruler of the First Saudi State
 Abdullah bin Faisal Al Saud (1831–1889), Ruler of the Emirate of Diriyah
 Abdullah bin Faisal Al Saud (1923–2007), Saudi royal and businessman
 Abdullah bin Thunayan Al Saud (died 1843), Emir of Nejd
 Abdullah of Saudi Arabia (1924–2015), Former ruler of Saudi Arabia
 Abdullah bin Muhammad Al Sheikh (1751–1829), Wahhabi scholar
 Abdullah Elyasa Süme (born 1983), Turkish association football player
 Abdullah Tal (1918–1973), Jordanian soldier
 Abdullah Al Thani (disambiguation), multiple people
 Ovadia Yosef (1920–2013), Israeli rabbi, born Abdullah Youssef

Surname

Abdalla
Ahmad Abdalla, Egyptian film director
Ali Abdalla, Eritrean long-distance runner
Asha Ahmed Abdalla, Somali politician
Khalid Abdalla, British actor

Abdallah
 Sallamah Umm Abdallah, was the spouse of Muhammad ibn Ali and mother of Al-Mansur.
 Marajil also known as Umm Abdallah. She was the mother of Abbasid caliph Al-Ma'mun.
Abu Makhlad Abdallah, Iranian statesman from Tabaristan
Ali al-Abdallah, Syrian writer and human rights activist
Gene G. Abdallah (1934–2019), American politician
Mohamed Abdallah (born Nov 1975), British citizen with African origin, A Chartered Accountant with ACCA and CPA(T)

Abdellah
Faye Glenn Abdellah (1919–2017), American nurse
Nacer Abdellah (born 1966), Moroccan footballer

Abdulah
Clive Abdulah (born 1927), former Bishop of Trinidad

Abdullah
 Abdul Abdullah (born 1986), Australian artist, brother of artist Abdul-Rahman Abdullah
 Abdul Rahman Abdullah, Muslim name of Donny Meluda, armed robber
 Abdul-Rahman Abdullah (born 1977), Australian artist, brother of artist Abdul Abdullah
 Abdullah Abdullah (born 1960), former foreign minister of Afghanistan
 Abdullah Ahmed Abdullah (1963–2020), al-Qaeda terrorist
 Adel Abdullah (born 1984), Syrian association football player
 Ameer Abdullah (born 1993), American football running back
 Bilal Abdullah (born 1980), British doctor of Iraqi descent behind the 2007 Glasgow International Airport attack
 Chelsea Abdullah, Kuwaiti American novelist
 Husain Abdullah (born 1985), American football safety for the Minnesota Vikings
 Khalid Abdullah (disambiguation), multiple people
 Majed Abdullah (born 1959), former Saudi Arabian footballer
 Mohamed Abdullah (disambiguation), multiple people
 Farah Zeynep Abdullah (born 1989), Turkish actress
 Mansoor Abdullah, Singaporean convicted killer 
 Mohammed Abdullah (disambiguation), multiple people
 Muhammad Kho Abdullah (1984–2016), Muslim name of Kho Jabing, convicted Malaysian killer 
 Nadhem Abdullah, Iraqi murdered during the Occupation of Iraq
 Omar Abdullah (born 1970), last Prime Minister of Jammu and Kashmir
 Rahim Abdullah (born 1976), former American football player
 Raja Abdullah bin Raja Jaafar, a participant in the Klang War
 Salem Abdullah (disambiguation), multiple people
 Salwa Abdullah (born 1953), Syrian politician
 Sheikh Abdullah (1905–1982), known as Sher-e-Kashmir, first Prime Minister of Jammu and Kashmir
 Tewfik Abdullah (born 1896), Egyptian footballer

Fictional characters
 Abdul Alhazred, sometimes referred to as Abdullah Alhazred
 Abdullah (comics), from The Adventures of Tintin by Hergé
 Abdullah the Butcher, born Lawrence Shreve, Canadian wrestler
 Abdullah ibn al-Wahhab from the Amelia Peabody series, foreman for the Emerson family's archeological excavation sites
Abdullah, main protagonist of Castle in the Air, the sequel to Howl's Moving Castle

See also

Related names
 Abdala
 Abdollah (disambiguation)
 Abdullah (disambiguation)
 Abdullah I (disambiguation)
 Abdullah II (disambiguation)
 Abdullah Al Mamun (disambiguation)
 Abdullah Khan (disambiguation)
 Abdullah Al Thani (disambiguation)
 Abdullahi
 Abu Abdullah
 Khalid Abdullah (disambiguation)
 King Abdullah (disambiguation)
 Mohamed Abdullah (disambiguation)
 Mohammed Abdullah (disambiguation)
 Raja Abdullah (disambiguation)
 Salem Abdullah (disambiguation)

Other
 Arabic name
 Dasa
 Turkish name
 List of Arabic theophoric names

References

Notes

Sources
А. В. Суперанская (A. V. Superanskaya). "Современный словарь личных имён: Сравнение. Происхождение. Написание" (Modern Dictionary of First Names: Comparison. Origins. Spelling). Айрис-пресс. Москва, 2005. 

Masculine given names
Arabic-language surnames
Arabic masculine given names
Bosniak masculine given names
Iranian masculine given names
Turkish masculine given names
Pakistani masculine given names
Theophoric names